Churchman is a surname. Notable people with the surname include:

Charles West Churchman (1913–2004), American philosopher
David Churchman (born 1938), a California State University professor
Leidy Churchman, American painter
Ricky Churchman (born 1958), American football player
William Churchman (1863–1947), an English tobacco manufacturer
Ysanne Churchman (born 1925), British actress